Frank Wall may refer to:
 Frank Wall (herpetologist) (1868–1950), physician and herpetologist in Sri Lanka and India
 Frank Wall (American politician) (1908–1998), member of the Mississippi House of Representatives
 Frank Wall (Australian politician) (1879–1941), Australian politician
 Frank Wall (Irish politician) (active 1981–1991), Irish politician
 Frank Wall (steamboat engineer) (1810–1896), American engineer
 Frank Wall (hurler), Irish hurler